REC Limited,  formerly Rural Electrification Corporation Limited is a subsidiary of Power Finance Corporation Limited (PFC) which in turn is under the ownership of the Ministry of Power, Government of India. It finances and promotes power projects across India. The PSU provides loans to Central/State Sector Power Utilities in the country, State Electricity Boards, Rural Electric Cooperatives, NGOs and Private Power Developers. On 28 March, PFC announced that it had completed making the payment for the acquisition and intended to merge REC with itself in 2020.

Business operations

REC is the 12th Maharatna Company functioning under the purview of the Ministry of Power. The company is listed on both the National Stock Exchange and the Bombay Stock Exchange. Business operations in India are supported by a network of 13 Project Offices and 5 Zonal Offices, headquartered in New Delhi.  :

Services
The company is primarily engaged in providing finance for rural electrification projects across India and provides loans to Central/ State Sector Power Utilities, State Electricity Boards, Rural Electric Cooperatives, NGOs and Private Power Developers. The company sanctions loan as a sole lender or co-lender or in consortium with or without the status of lead financer. It also provides consultancy, project monitoring and financial/ technical appraisal support for projects, also in the role of nodal agency for Government of India schemes or projects.  It engages in ascertaining financial requirements of power utilities in the country in the T&D sector along with appraising T&D schemes for financing. REC has financed T&D schemes for system improvement, intensive electrification, pump-set energisation and APDRP Programme.
The company is also actively involved in physical as well as financial monitoring of T&D schemes.

REC also offers loan products for financing Renewable Energy projects. The company has tied up a line of credit for €100M (approximately 6000M) with KfW under Indo-German Development Cooperation for financing renewable energy power projects at concessional rates of interest. Eligible projects include solar, wind, small hydro, biomass power, and cogeneration power & hybrid projects

GARV APP is an application developed and maintained by REC, incepted to aid the Grameen Vidyutikaran Mission running under DDUGJY (Deen Dayal Upadhyaya Gram Jyoti Yojana). The App “GARV” (Grameen Vidyutikaran), which provides real-time updates on electrification status of 18452 UE villages, was launched on 14th Oct, 2015 The mobile app is accessible to all stakeholders including the general public at large.

Finances
The Company was listed on the National Stock Exchange and the Bombay Stock Exchange on 12 March 2008. REC went for Initial Public Offer of 156,120,000 Equity Shares in February 2008 which was oversubscribed by about 27 times, raising a total amount of 819 crores.  Further Public Offer of 171,732,000 equity shares was made in February 2010. The issue was oversubscribed by 3.14 times, raising a total of 26.47 billion

The company is currently among the top 500 Global Financial Services brands by UK-based plc Brand Finance. The company is also among the Forbes Global 2000 companies for 2010. Domestic debt instruments of REC are assigned the highest rating "AAA" by  credit rating agencies CRISIL, Fitch and ICRA. Moody’s and Fitch have rated its international credit rating at par with India’s sovereign rating.

International collaborations have included past tie-ups for External Commercial Borrowings with Standard Chartered Bank (London), DEPFA Investment Bank Limited (Cyprus) etc. as well as current tie-ups with KfW (Germany) and Japan International Cooperation Agency (Japan) under Official Development Assistance. As an IFC, REC can also issue Infrastructure Bonds and raise funds up to US$500M through External Commercial Borrowing in a year.

History

Early years

REC was set up in July 1969, in the backdrop of a critical drought situation facing India in the late sixties. The company’s initial mandate was mainly to help State Electricity Boards energise pump-sets across the country to boost agriculture and overcome the crippling impact of three successive years of deficient monsoons. The company also provided finance to accelerate the pace of rural electrification in the overall context of planned programmes for increased agricultural production. Besides finance, REC also offered appraising, consultancy, technical support and monitoring of projects, to assist State Electricity Boards/Power Utilities, Rural Electric Cooperatives and other such institutions.

Post-Liberalised India (1990s)

Liberalisation by the Government of India (GoI) in 1991 saw introduction of amendments to existing laws and reform measures enabling the private sector to participate in large-scale in manufacturing industry, services industry and infrastructure. Sectors like power, airports, seaports, roadways, projects were identified for private participation, and nodal agencies were set up to do the initial spade work and later hand over such projects to private players through competitive bidding routes. In April 2006, GoI identified 14 transmission projects worth 200 billion for development by 2012. REC was identified as one of the two GoI-appointed nodal agencies for transferring identified projects to private developers. REC also started extending loans to manufacturers of T&D equipment.

2000–Current

Till 2000, REC focused on the Transmission and Distribution aspect of power, with projects for household electrification in rural and semi-urban areas, area electrification in tribal/ dalit areas, intensive electrification, and system improvement projects based on strengthening and improving transmission, sub transmission and distribution systems. REC’s portfolio of Generation projects constituted mainly Mini/Micro Generation Projects up to 25MW capacity till 2000. In June 2002, the mandate of REC was expanded to include financing of all generation projects without limit on size or location. Today, financing of Generation projects has become a major thrust-area of operations for REC, also attracting majority of its private sector borrowers.

Since 2005, REC has been appointed nodal agency by Ministry of Power   for Government of India scheme Rajiv Gandhi Grameen Vidyutikaran Yojana aimed at building rural electricity infrastructure and household electrification towards the National Common Minimum Programme goal of access to electricity for all. Under the scheme, 90% capital subsidy is provided by Government of India for overall cost of projects. Cumulatively till FY10, works in 190,858 villages have been completed and free connections to over 10 million below poverty line (BPL) households have been released. The REC is the nodal agency under the newly launched SAUBHAGYA Yojana by the present Modi government.

REC Institute of Power Management & Training (RECIPMT)

In 1979, REC established a national training institute in Hyderabad for the development of techno-managerial skill and efficiency in State Electricity Boards (SEBs), Distribution Companies, Rural Electric Cooperatives and other Power Utilities, and also to conduct in-house training programmes for REC’s employees. CIRE also served as a platform for association with other institutions towards a common goal of Rural Electrification (RE) and rural energy development.

Today, RECIPMT conducts regular programmes on various aspects of Transmission and Distribution for national and international executives in the power sector, including seminars participated by both private and public utilities. Programmes focus on adoption of innovative and cost effective modern technologies, training in both conventional and non-conventional energy areas and practical demonstrations via an in-house Energy Park.

Energy Efficiency Services Limited (EESL)

EESL is a joint venture (JV) with 4 power PSUs – REC, Powergrid, NTPC, and PFC for implementing energy efficiency projects, promoting usage of energy efficient appliances, promoting the concept of Energy Service Companies (ESCOs) etc.

Indian Energy Exchange (IEX)

REC is an equity partner in Indian Energy Exchange (IEX), India’s first nationwide, automated, and online electricity trading platform (power exchange/ electricity market), among other reputed investors like IDFC, Adani, Reliance Energy, Lanco and Tata Power.

See also
 Electricity sector in India
 Saubhagya scheme

References

External links

 Official website

Electric power companies of India
Rural electrification
Rural development organisations in India
Financial services companies of India
Government-owned companies of India
Companies based in New Delhi
Indian companies established in 1969
Energy companies established in 1969
Ministry of Power (India)
1969 establishments in Delhi
Companies listed on the National Stock Exchange of India
Companies listed on the Bombay Stock Exchange